Arthur John Jex-Blake  (31 July 1873 – 16 August 1957) was a British physician, specializing in heart and lung diseases.

Biography
After education at Eton, Arthur John Jex-Blake matriculated at Magdalen College, Oxford, where he graduated BA in 1894, MA in 1901, BM and BCh in 1901, and DM in 1913. He entered as a University scholar at St George's Hospital Medical School, where he received his medical education. In 1902 the University of Oxford awarded him a Radcliffe travelling fellowship, enabling him to visit Vienna, Copenhagen, and Baltimore. He was appointed to the staff of the Victoria Hospital for Children and then became an assistant physician to St George's Hospital and to the Royal Brompton Hospital. He qualified MRCP in 1905 and was elected FRCP in 1912. In 1913 he delivered the Goulstonian Lectures.

During WWI he served as a major in the Royal Army Medical Corps in France and upon his return was appointed a full physician at St George's Hospital. In 1920 he married, resigned all of his London appointments, and moved with his bride to Kenya, where he lived until his death in 1957.

Family
Arthur John Jex-Blake was a son of Rev. Thomas William Jex-Blake, D.D. headmaster of Rugby School from 1874 to 1887 and a nephew of the famous physician and feminist Sophia Jex-Blake. His siblings included Katharine Jex-Blake, Mistress of Girton College from 1916 to 1922; Henrietta Jex-Blake, principal of Lady Margaret Hall from 1909 to 1921; and Bertha Jex-Blake, physician who studied at the Edinburgh College of Medicine for women established by her aunt. Bertha drowned near Whitby in 1915.  

On 5 August 1920 in Wilton, Wiltshire, A. J. Jex-Blake married Lady Muriel Katherine Herbert (1883–1951), daughter of Sidney Herbert, 14th Earl of Pembroke.

The couple met in Boulogne in WWI when he was a doctor and she was a volunteer nurse. The Jex-Blakes had one daughter, Daphne Marian Jex-Blake (1923–1970); she married Richard Mason.

Selected publications

with W. James Wilson:  In this paper the case of infection in patient D.H. with B. aertrycke would in current medical terminology be called typhoid fever due to infection by Salmonella enterica serotype Typhi; the case of infection in patient J.A.M. would be called paratyphoid fever due to infection by Salmonella enterica serotype Paratyphi B. The name of the bacterial species was changed. In 1928 medical experts were not entirely sure that B. aertrycke consisted of Salmonella.

References

External links

1873 births
1957 deaths
People educated at Eton College
Alumni of Magdalen College, Oxford
British cardiologists
British pulmonologists
Alumni of St George's, University of London
Fellows of the Royal College of Physicians
Physicians of St George's Hospital
Royal Army Medical Corps officers